Ammannia verticillata is a species in the family Lythraceae. It is found in central and southeast Asia, and is naturalized in southern Europe. It grows in wet places such as marshes, river banks and rice fields.

References

verticillata